Alavandipuram is a village in the Papanasam taluk of Thanjavur district, Tamil Nadu, India.

Demographics 

As per the 2001 census, Alavandipuram had a total population of 1853 with 884 males and 969 females. The sex ratio was 1096. The literacy rate was 63.8.

References 

 

Villages in Thanjavur district